UPIXO in Action: Mission in Snowdriftland (or simply Mission in Snowdriftland) is a Flash-based platform game created by German studio Extra Toxic, with help from Nintendo. Doubling as a game and an advent calendar advertising different Nintendo products, every day from December 1 to December 24, 2006, an extra level was added to the game. Each level was filled with enemies and 24 snowflakes. Collecting every snowflake in a level unlocked secret downloads. The game was supposed to be taken offline on January 14, but was delayed until January 16. The original version of the game is no longer available via the official website, but it is archived and accessible through BlueMaxima's Flashpoint. The game was scored by Fabian Del Priore.

Storyline
El Pix, an evil penguin, has stolen game files from the Human World, and made off with them to his lair in Snowdriftland. UPIXO (United Pixelheroes Organisation) has no clue what to do, seeing as the region is far too cold for anybody to survive. However, the UPIXO boss's assistant, Professor Schwabbel, spots Chubby Snow, a living snowman, who is complaining at the front desk because all his video game roles have been bad so far, and asks him to get back the game files. Every day in December 2006, a new level in Chubby's adventure becomes accessible, leading up to the final showdown with El Pix on December 24.

Gameplay
The game is divided into 4 areas: floating chunks of ice, a forest, an iceberg, and El Pix's lair. Each area has 6 stages (The stage's number corresponds to the day in December 2006 it was released), for a total of 24. Each stage contains 24 snowflakes, which the plater could collect to unlock rewards for the game/console files that they managed to retrieve during that level. The player does not have to beat a stage to access the next one, however there is a reward for getting all snowflakes in every stage, and the final battle cannot be accessed until they have finished all stages. At first, Chubby can only take 3 hits before he dies. A few levels contain hidden power-ups such as extra heart containers, which will add a permanent extra heart to Chubby's life meter.

Restoration
While the game was no longer available due to limited accessibility, the game was still playable on ExtraToxic's website after January 16. The site was meant to be password protected, however this was non-functional due to a programming bug.

The game was re-released in the winter period of 2010 to promote indie games available on Nintendo's WiiWare online market, though it was subject to the same timed release window, making the game only accessible for a few more days.

Web browsers would also cease the use of Adobe Flash Player in December 2020, the framework Snowdriftland ran on. However, BlueMaxima's Flashpoint saved these experiences as well as reviving Snowdriftland, which is now playable in their catalogue.

A video made by YouTuber Nick Robinson, titled "Mission in Snowdriftland: Nintendo's forgotten Flash game", revealed that a remaster has been announced for a Steam release in late 2021 with the developers also possibly creating a Nintendo Switch port of the game in the future.

See also
 Chick Chick Boom

References

External links
 Website
Mirror

2006 video games
Browser games
Fictional penguins
Fictional snowmen
Flash games
Platform games
Single-player online games
Video games developed in Germany
Video games scored by Fabian Del Priore